Dailin Taset (born 19 July 1978) is a Cuban rower. She competed at the 2000 Summer Olympics and the 2004 Summer Olympics.

References

1978 births
Living people
Cuban female rowers
Olympic rowers of Cuba
Rowers at the 2000 Summer Olympics
Rowers at the 2004 Summer Olympics
People from Granma Province
Pan American Games medalists in rowing
Pan American Games gold medalists for Cuba
Pan American Games silver medalists for Cuba
Rowers at the 2003 Pan American Games
21st-century Cuban women